Decentralist Party (in Spanish: Partido Descentralista) was a political party in Peru. Its president was Francisco Tamayo.

Defunct political parties in Peru
Political parties with year of disestablishment missing
Political parties with year of establishment missing